Evenhuis is a surname. Notable people with the surname include:

 Gertie Evenhuis (1927–2005), Dutch writer
 Neal Evenhuis (born 1952), American entomologist
 Jiri Evenhuis (born 1973), Dutch industrial designer